Cuban-born American artist Félix González-Torres (November 26, 1957 – January 9, 1996) produced a wide variety of artworks during his lifetime. Comprising pieces that are often open-ended in their formal presentation and range across many mediums, combining elements of drawing, painting, photography, printmaking, sculpture, video, and installation art, González-Torres' body of work is relatively small but influential. The majority of the artist's formal works were accompanied by certificates of authenticity that often also specified - or expressly didn't specify - installation instructions, 
either directing the owner or presenter of the works to follow installation guidelines, or empowering them to make decisions on how to construct, arrange, or install the works. Given the participatory nature of many of González-Torres' works, including his interactive paper stack and candy spill works that must eventually be replenished, these certificates also sometimes specified how to reproduce or where to purchase the materials needed to sustain the works. For a large number of the artist's works, these certificates are the only permanent component, as the other portions of the work (e.g. piles of candy, stacks of paper, etc.) are purchased or reproduced by the owner or presenter of the work.

Below are chronological, though incomplete, lists of the artist's works. Nearly all of González-Torres' formal works are named some variant of "Untitled", with the quotation marks a formal element of the title; many different works across different mediums have identical titles. Full medium descriptions, work dimensions, and edition sizes are included with each listing, along with locations in public collections noted where known, to aid in differentiation between works.

González-Torres' output can be sorted into three discrete categories, each of which has its own list below: formal works, disavowed "non-works," and "additional material" circulated by the artist. Formal works are works of art completed or conceptualized by the artist during his lifetime that he formally considered to be part of his oeuvre; the majority of these works are extant and owned by public or private collections. The artist's formal works are the most widely known, cited, and exhibited elements of his artistic output. "Non-works" are works that the artist created and exhibited during his lifetime but later disavowed and declared no longer works of art. González-Torres disavowed and destroyed nearly all works created prior to 1988, including nearly all of the work he created while attending university in Puerto Rico and most of his early output from his time in New York. Non-works are assumed to be destroyed unless otherwise noted. "Additional material" comprises photographs, correspondence, and other ephemera that had served as precursors to the final physical or conceptual form of formal works, as well as versions of formal works outside of the official editions. The artist circulated these materials with friends, collectors, and other artists, but did not consider them to be formal works of art. Many of the additional materials are nearly identical to formal works by the artist. Additionally, some public and private collections have retained or acquired individual papers from installations of one or more of the artist's endlessly replenishable paper stack works; these individual sheets were not considered works in themselves by the artist and these collections are not included on these lists.

Images of González-Torres' work are subject to copyright by the Felix Gonzalez-Torres Foundation, formed in 2002 by the artist's estate as the sole licensor of copyright. Catalogue numbers are references to the 1997 catalogue raisonné of the artist's work, along with the Foundation's public archival catalogue. Neither of these catalogues include every piece of material the artist created or conceptualized during his lifetime, and these lists may not be exhaustive.

List of formal works 
Formal works are works of art deemed to be part of González-Torres' oeuvre by the artist during his lifetime. Three works on this list were conceptualized during the artist's lifetime and executed posthumously. Catalogue numbers for formal works were formatted as a sequential numbered list in the 1997 catalogue raisonné; the corresponding catalogue numbers were amended and re-numbered for the Felix Gonzalez-Torres Foundation's public catalogue, in line with the numbering system from the artist's original gallery catalogue. This list defaults to sorting works by their catalogue number in the Foundation's catalogue.

Many of the works in González-Torres' formal oeuvre were accompanied by certificates of authenticity; six series of works in particular were universally accompanied by these certificates. The certificates for these series - replenishable stacks, candy pieces, billboards, lightstrings, beaded curtains, and date portraits - included extensive language defining the works conceptually and physically. Replenishable stacks, date portraits, beaded curtains, and candy pieces are marked in the Notes column on the full list of works to distinguish them from others.

Replenishable stacks: Certificates include the original type and weight of paper used for the first manifestation of the work, with instructions to use a similar paper if the original is not available; descriptions of what is printed on the paper and how it was printed; an ideal height at which the stack should be installed; instructions allowing viewers to take individual sheets from the installed work; instructions allowing the owner to replenish the stack; language specifying that individual sheets taken from the work do not themselves comprise individual works of art; and language defining the work as unique by its ownership, explained to mean that it can be manifested in multiple locations at once without its uniqueness being threatened.
Candy pieces: Certificates include the original type of candy or wrapper used for the first manifestation of the work and the original supplier of the candy, with instructions to use a similar candy if the original is unavailable; an ideal weight at which the piece should be installed and the original installation layout; instructions allowing viewers to take individual candies from the installed work; instructions allowing the owner to install the work in a layout of their liking and to replenish the candies when they see fit; and language defining the work as unique by its ownership, explained to mean that it can be manifested in multiple locations at once without its uniqueness being threatened.
Billboards: Certificates include the original image for the work; language allowing the owner to install the image as a billboard, concurrently in multiple public outdoor locations as many times as desired, as well as applied directly to a wall indoors in one place at a time, printed to the size of the entire wall; instructions on how to crop the image; requirements for the work to be installed outdoors at least once if borrowed for an exhibition; and language defining documentation of the work as a formal conceptual element, along with requests for owners and exhibitors to document each installation of the work. Three billboard works significantly differ in their conceptual format, as noted in the full list: "Untitled" (Portrait of Austrian Airlines) (1993); "Untitled" (For Parkett) (1994); and "Untitled" (1994-1995).
Lightstrings: Certificates include technical specifications about the lights, sockets, and cords, with instructions to use similar bulbs if the originals are unavailable; language defining the work as complete when owners choose their own unique configuration and install it; instructions allowing the work to be installed in different manifestations whenever the owner desires; requirements for the bulbs to be replaced as they burn out; and instructions to exhibit the work with all the lights either on or off.
Beaded curtains: Certificates include the original type, dimension, color, and order of beads used for the first manifestation of the work, with instructions to use a similar bead if the originals are unavailable; instructions allowing the owner to install the work in any entranceway; and requirements that the beads hang from the ceiling to the floor and span the width of the entire entranceway.
Date portraits: Certificates include the original text and years chosen by the artist and owner; instructions allowing the owner to add to or subtract from the original list of text and years, as well as to change the location of the work; ideal installation instructions, with the work painted directly onto the wall(s) just below where the wall meets the ceiling; color and font specifications, with the text to be in silver paint and Trump Mediaeval Bold Italic typeface on a wall color of the owner's choice; instructions allowing the text size to change whenever the work is reinstalled to fit the new location; and language defining the work as unique by its ownership, explained to mean that it can be manifested in multiple locations at once without its uniqueness being threatened.

Abbreviations: AP = Artist's proof; AAP = Additional artist's proof; PP = Printer's proof; CR = catalogue raisonné

List of non-works 
These non-works were created and exhibited by the artist during his lifetime but disavowed - and in most cases destroyed - before his death. Most of González-Torres' output prior to 1988 was deemed a non-work by the artist and formally disavowed; most of these works are no longer extant. Many of these non-works are similar to formal works; these are noted where known. Non-works included in the 1997 catalogue raisonné were given catalogue numbers in sequential roman numerals; the corresponding catalogue numbers from the Felix Gonzalez-Torres Foundation are the same, with the addition of "N-W" for non-work. Non-works that were not included in the 1997 CR do not have catalogue numbers.

List of additional materials 
These materials are not formal works of art by the artist, as he specified prior to his death. Many of these listed materials are similar to, earlier iterations of, or studies for formal works the artist eventually exhibited and sold; these are noted where known. Catalogue numbers for additional materials were formatted as "A#" in the 1997 catalogue raisonné; the corresponding catalogue numbers from the Felix Gonzalez-Torres Foundation are the same, with the addition of "M" for additional material.

References 

González-Torres
Félix González-Torres
LGBT art in the United States